Nanjing North railway station may refer to:
Nanjing North railway station (opened 1914), a freight-only station
Nanjing North railway station (under construction), a passenger station expected to open in 2025